The Story of the Book of Kings, also called the Midrash on the Book of Kings, is a lost work mentioned in the Bible. The book is found nowhere in the Old Testament, so it is presumed to have been lost or removed from the earlier texts.

The book is described in :

References 

Lost Jewish texts